Maja Kožnjak (born 16 April 1985) is a Croatian handball player for Kastamonu Bld. GSK and the Croatian national team.

She played in her country for  CRO ZRK "Tvin Trgocentar" Virovitica  (2003–2004), RK Podravka Koprivnica (2005–2012) and RK Lokomotiva Zagreb(2012–2015 ) before she moved to the Antalya-based club Muratpaşa Bld. SK to play in the Turkish Women's Handball Super League. After one season, she transferred to Kastamonu Bld. GSK.

References

1985 births
Living people
Croatian female handball players
Sportspeople from Virovitica
Croatian expatriate sportspeople in Turkey
Expatriate handball players in Turkey
Muratpaşa Bld. SK (women's handball) players
Kastamonu Bld. SK (women's handball) players
RK Podravka Koprivnica players
21st-century Croatian women